The Newport Street Gallery is an art gallery in London, England which displays works selected from the personal art collection of Damien Hirst. It is located on Newport Street in Vauxhall and is the realisation of Hirst's long-term ambition to share his art collection with the public.

Hirst announced plans for the gallery in March 2012, and it opened in October 2015. It includes a cafe, gallery shop and offices for Hirst's company.

The building is a former theatre carpentry and scenery production workshop, dating from 1913. It was designed by John Woodward, the London County Council's district surveyor for the area. It is Grade II listed. For its conversion to the gallery, the building was redesigned by Caruso St John. The design was praised for its "virtuosity", and in October 2016 it won the RIBA Stirling Prize.

The gallery spans 37,000 square feet and includes six exhibition spaces – one with a ceiling height of 11 metres – split over two levels.

The collection
The Murderme collection, which Hirst has been acquiring since the late 1980s, contains over 3,000 works and features art by Francis Bacon, Banksy, Tracey Emin, Richard Hamilton, Jeff Koons, Sarah Lucas, Pablo Picasso, Richard Prince, Haim Steinbach and Gavin Turk, as well as a number of young and emerging artists such as Helen Beard, Sadie Laska and Boo Saville and a significant collection of work by indigenous artists from the Pacific Northwest coast. 

Also featured are natural history specimens, taxidermy, anatomical models and historical artefacts. The collection was previously the subject of large-scale exhibitions at the Serpentine Gallery, London (2006) and the Pinacoteca Giovanni e Marella Agnelli, Turin (2013).

References

External links

Art galleries in London
Damien Hirst
Art galleries established in 2015
2015 establishments in England
Vauxhall
Grade II listed buildings in the London Borough of Lambeth